The Tattooing of Minors Act 1969 (c. 24) is an Act of Parliament of the Parliament of the United Kingdom. It gained Royal Assent on 16 May 1969, and is currently in force.

The Act made it an offence to tattoo a person under the age of eighteen, save for medical reasons.

The Act did not extend to Northern Ireland, though similar regulations were later instituted there by the Tattooing of Minors (Northern Ireland) Order 1979.

See also
 Legal status of tattooing in European countries

References

United Kingdom Acts of Parliament 1969
Tattooing and law